Sir Frank Noyce, KCSI, CBE (4 June 1878 – 7 October 1948) was a member of the Indian Civil Service and member of Governor-General's Executive Council in charge of industries and labour from 1932 to 1937. Noyce was also a member of the Indian Public Schools' Society, which was set up by Satish Ranjan Das in 1928 with the aim of establishing The Doon School, an all-boys public school modelled on Eton College and Harrow School.

His eldest son was the mountaineer and author Wilfrid Noyce, who was a member of the 1953 British Expedition that made the first ascent of Mount Everest.

References

External links 

 

1878 births
1948 deaths
Knights Commander of the Order of the Star of India
Commanders of the Order of the British Empire
Indian Civil Service (British India) officers
Alumni of St Catharine's College, Cambridge
Knights Bachelor
People educated at Bishop Wordsworth's School
Members of the Council of the Governor General of India
British people in colonial India